Poodle Springs is a 1998 neo-noir HBO film directed by Bob Rafelson, starring James Caan as private detective Philip Marlowe.

The film is based on the unfinished novel Poodle Springs by Raymond Chandler, completed after his death by Robert B. Parker and published in 1989.

Playwright Tom Stoppard wrote the screenplay.

Plot
In 1963, an aging Philip Marlowe (James Caan) is newly married to young socialite Laura Parker (Dina Meyer). The private investigator leaves his Los Angeles apartment behind and sets up a new base of operations in Poodle Springs, an upscale community in the desert a couple hours from L.A. (a parody of Palm Springs), where he and his wife intend to live.

"I don't do divorces," Marlowe impatiently explains to potential clients in a peaceful, relatively crime-free town. His rich wife Laura would prefer that Philip get out of this line of work entirely and live off her money or come into business with P.J. Parker (Joe Don Baker), her politically connected father, but Marlowe isn't ready to permanently hang up his gun.

As might be expected, crime follows Marlowe wherever he may be. While looking into a matter at a gambling club just beyond the city limits, Marlowe sets out to find a photographer with a gambling debt and is soon mixed up in blackmail and murder.

Larry Victor, the photographer (David Keith), is a bigamist, two-timing Laura's wealthy friend Muffy (Julia Campbell) with a drug addict named Angel (Nia Peeples), and he is threatening to expose photos of a former stripper (La Joy Farr) who is now running with Muffy's billionaire father, Clayton Blackstone (Brian Cox).

As things progress, Marlowe realizes that his new father-in-law is involved in a land swindle on such a massive scale that it could end up altering the California/Nevada state border. And any further snooping on the detective's part could quickly put an end to his wedded bliss.

Cast
 James Caan as Philip Marlowe
 Dina Meyer as Laura Parker-Marlowe
 David Keith as Larry Victor/Charles Nichols
 Joe Don Baker as P.J. Parker
 Tom Bower as Lt. Arnie Burns
 Julia Campbell as Miriam "Muffy" Blackstone-Nichols
 Brian Cox as Clayton Blackstone
 Nia Peeples as Angel
 Mo Gallini as J.D.

References

External links
 

American detective films
Films based on American novels
Films directed by Bob Rafelson
Films scored by Michael Small
Films set in 1963
1998 television films
1998 films
Films set in Palm Springs, California
Films with screenplays by Tom Stoppard
Films based on works by Raymond Chandler
Films based on British novels
American neo-noir films
1990s English-language films
1990s American films